Language Learning: A Journal of Research in Language Studies is a peer-reviewed academic journal published quarterly by Wiley-Blackwell on behalf of the Language Learning Research Club at the University of Michigan. The editor-in-chief is Nick C. Ellis University of Michigan.

Language Learning covers research on "fundamental theoretical issues in language learning such as child, second, and foreign language acquisition, language education, bilingualism, literacy, language representation in mind and brain, culture, cognition, pragmatics, and intergroup relations". The journal has two annual supplements, the Best of Language Learning Series and the Language Learning Monograph Series. It is also published in association with a biennial monograph, the Language Learning-Max Planck Institute Cognitive Neurosciences Series.

According to the Journal Citation Reports, the journal has a 2011 impact factor of 1.218, ranking it 26th out of 161 journals in the category "Linguistics" and 42nd out of 203 journals in the category "Education & Educational Research".

Editorial board
General Editor: Nick C. Ellis 
Journal Editor: Pavel Trofimovich 
Associate Journal Editor: Emma Marsden 
Associate Journal Editor: Kara Morgan-Short 
Associate Journal Editor: Scott Crossley 
Editor of Special Thematic Issues & Associate Journal Editor: Judit Kormos 
Currents in Language Learning Series Editor & Associate General Editor: Lourdes Ortega 
LL Cognitive Neuroscience Series Editor: Guillaume Thierry 
Executive Director: Scott Jarvis 
Associate Executive Director: Jeff Connor-Linton

See also 
List of applied linguistics journals

References

External links 
 

Language education journals
English-language journals
Publications established in 1948
Quarterly journals
Wiley-Blackwell academic journals